Redoute's Choice (15 August 1996 – 26 March 2019) was a multiple Group One-winning Australian Thoroughbred racehorse and also a champion sire.  He is by the phenomenal international sire Danehill (USA) out of the lightly raced mare Shantha's Choice (Canny Lad-Dancing Show).  His dam is a half-sister to the Group One winners Hurricane Sky (by Star Watch) and Umatilla (by Miswaki (USA)), and later produced the Group One winners Platinum Scissors (also by Danehill) and Manhattan Rain (by Encosta De Lago).

Racing career
Redoute's Choice was raced by his breeder, Sri Lankan businessman Muzaffar Ali Yaseen, and trained by Rick Hore-Lacy.  On debut, he won the Listed Veuve Cliquot Stakes (1,100 metres) at Caulfield on 20 February 1999.  Seven days later, and starting from a wide barrier, he won the prestigious Blue Diamond Stakes (1,200 metres) by two lengths from his future arch-rival, Testa Rossa, whose preparation for the race had been interrupted by a slight injury.  Testa Rossa then won the VRC Sires Produce Stakes before a spell, while Redoute's Choice was promoted to favouritism for the Golden Slipper - the world's richest race for two-year-olds - but was scratched the night before the race due to a raised temperature.  Sydney gelding Shogun Lodge ultimately started favourite, while the race was won by another Danehill colt, Catbird.

Redoute's Choice made his return as a spring three-year-old in the Manikato Stakes (1,200 metres) at Moonee Valley.  In winning this race, Redoute's Choice made it three stakes wins from as many starts, and became a Group One winner at weight-for-age at just his third start.  At his next two starts, he was second-last of five behind the outsider Spargo in the Ascot Vale Stakes (1,200 metres) at Flemington and third behind Testa Rossa in the Invitation Stakes (1,400 metres) at Caulfield.  Three weeks later, over an extra 200 metres in the Caulfield Guineas, Redoute's Choice defeated Testa Rossa after a dogged battle down the straight, while another future stallion, Commands, finished third.  Two weeks later, Redoute's Choice, Testa Rossa, and Commands lined up in the Cox Plate (2,040 metres), but the relatively poor recent record of three-year-olds continued, with all three finishing unplaced, as the field came in at lengthy intervals behind the champion mare Sunline.

In the new year, Redoute's Choice had three further starts - all in Group One races.  He began with a second to Miss Pennymoney in the Australia Stakes (1,200 metres) at Moonee Valley, and was well-ridden in beating the same filly in the C F Orr Stakes (1,400 metres) second-up at Caulfield.  At his final start, over the same course, he was third behind Testa Rossa and Miss Pennymoney in the Futurity Stakes. Redoute's Choice retired with career earnings of A$1,567,850.

During this time, Arrowfield Stud had bought a significant share in the colt, and he entered stud later in the year.

Stud career
Redoute's Choice stood at Arrowfield Stud after his retirement in 2000.

Notable stock

Redoute's Choice has sired 39 individual Group 1 winners

c = colt, f = filly, g = gelding

Redoute's Choice was crowned champion first season sire in Australia in 2004 and champion sire in 2006.  With ten crops of racing age, Redoute's Choice established himself as the heir apparent (in Australia) to his champion sire Danehill, and his fee was A$137,500. He excelled as a sire of two-year-olds - with quinellas in the Golden Slipper and the Blue Diamond and a trifecta in the Magic Millions on the Gold Coast - and also produced Group One-winning three- and four-year-olds.

Redoute's Choice produced about 150 stakeswinners and 30 Group 1 winners including Miss Finland, The Autumn Sun, Lotteria, God's Own, Snitzel, Stratum, Fashions Afield, Nadeem, Undoubtedly, Bradbury's Luck, Samantha Miss, and Cheeky Choice. Six of his sons have also sired G1 winners: Not A Single Doubt (Miracles of Life and Always Certain); Stratum (Streama, Southern Lord, Crystal Lily); Snitzel (Sizzling, Shamus Award); Duelled (Shootoff); Fast 'n Famous (Quintessential); Bradbury's Luck (Luckygray). ASB - SW progeny

Redoute's Choice was also dominant in the sales ring, having led the sale averages at the Australian Easter Yearling Sales for nine consecutive years.

In 2013 Redoute's Choice stood his first season at the Aga Khan IV Stud's Haras de Bonneval in France. He covered a blueblood book of mares during his first European breeding season including Zarkava- the unbeaten 2008 European Horse of the Year, Group 1 winner Alpine Rose, Born Gold - the dam of 2010 European Horse of the Year [Goldikova] and G1 winner Galikova, dual G1 winner Shareta, Forest Pearl - dam of Champion Miss Finland, G1 winner Vadawina and G1 winner Rosanara.

Arrowfield Stud announced the death of Redoute's Choice on 26 March 2019 at the age of 22. The horse was humanely euthanized after suffering a loss of mobility which could not be restored.

Pedigree

See also
 List of millionaire racehorses in Australia

References

 Redoute's Choice's racing record
 Pedigree and partial racing stats for Redoute's Choice
 July 17, 2006 article on Redoute's Choice by David Bay at the racehorse.com
 

1996 racehorse births
Racehorses bred in Australia
Racehorses trained in Australia
Champion Thoroughbred Sires of Australia
Thoroughbred family 8-f
2019 racehorse deaths